Leopold Infeld (20 August 1898 – 15 January 1968) was a Polish physicist who worked mainly in Poland and Canada (1938–1950). He was a Rockefeller fellow at Cambridge University (1933–1934) and a member of the Polish Academy of Sciences.

Early life
Leopold Infeld was born into a family of Polish Jews in Kraków, then part of the Austro-Hungarian Empire (it rejoined an independent Poland in 1918). He studied physics at Kraków's Jagiellonian University and from 1920 in Berlin, where he had engaged Albert Einstein's help to gain admission to the University of Berlin. He obtained a doctorate in 1921. In 1933 he left for England, then for the United States and Canada after the death of his second wife, Halina.

Work

Infeld was interested in the theory of relativity. He was awarded a doctorate at the Jagiellonian University(1921), worked as an assistant and a docent at the University of Lwów (1930–1933) and then as a professor at the University of Toronto between 1939 and 1950. He collaborated with Albert Einstein at Princeton University (1936–1938). The two scientists jointly formulated the equation describing star movements as well as concurrently writing the book The Evolution of Physics.

After the first use of nuclear weapons in 1945, Infeld, like Einstein, became a peace activist. Because of his activities, he was unjustly accused of having communist sympathies. In 1950 he left Canada and returned to communist Poland. He felt he had an obligation to help science in Poland recover from the ravages of the Second World War. He served as president of the Polish Physical Society between 1955 and 1957. In the staunchly anti-communist climate of the time, many in the Canadian government and media feared that working in a communist country; he would betray nuclear weapons secrets. He was stripped of his Canadian citizenship and was widely denounced as a traitor. In actuality, Infeld's field was the theory of relativity—not directly linked to nuclear weapons research. After Infeld's return to Poland, he requested a leave of absence from the University of Toronto. His request was denied, and Infeld resigned his post. In 1995 the University of Toronto made amends and granted Infeld the posthumous title of professor emeritus. Upon his return to Poland, Infeld became a professor at the University of Warsaw, a post he held until his death.

The Born–Infeld model was named after Max Born and Leopold Infeld, who first proposed it. The Infeld-Hull Factorization Method describing general sets of solutions to the Schrödinger equation.

Infeld was one of the 11 signatories to the Russell–Einstein Manifesto in 1955 and is the only signatory never to receive a Nobel Prize.

In 1964 he was one of the signatories of the so-called Letter of 34 to Prime Minister Józef Cyrankiewicz regarding freedom of culture.

Infeld is the author of Quest: "An Autobiography" and the biography "Whom the Gods Love: The Story of Évariste Galois."

In 1939 he married Helen Schlauch, an American mathematician.

Publications

References

Further reading

External links

1898 births
1968 deaths
Jews from Galicia (Eastern Europe)
Jagiellonian University alumni
Academics of the University of Cambridge
Princeton University faculty
Members of the Polish Academy of Sciences
Polish relativity theorists
Academic staff of the University of Toronto
Academic staff of the University of Warsaw
Jewish physicists
Members of the German Academy of Sciences at Berlin
Jewish Canadian scientists
People who lost Canadian citizenship
Polish atheists
Canadian emigrants to Poland